Premik Number One (also known by the initialism Premik No.1) is 2013 Bangladeshi romantic drama film. The film directed by Rakibul Islam Rakib and produced by Anwar Hossain Mintu. It feature an ensemble cast, which includes Shakib Khan, Apu Biswas, Nipun Akter, Misha Sawdagor, Bobita, Kazi Hayat, Sabrina Sultana Keya, Sujata, Amaan Reza, Shahnoor, Shahin Alam and Kabila.

Plot
The story is of Tibro (Shakib Khan), a boy from humble beginning who ends up between a rock and a hard place. We see him wooing two ladies while goons are chasing after him.

Cast 
 Shakib Khan as Tibro / Rasel
 Apu Biswas as Simi
 Nipun Akter as Tania
 Sabrina Sultana Keya as Keya
 Amaan Reza as Amaan
 Bobita as Momtaz Begum
 Kazi Hayat as Azad
 Sujata as Afia
 Shahin Alam as Shuvro
 Shahnoor as Moon
 Kabila as Abul
 Jesmin
 Misha Sawdagor as Sultan
 Shiba Shanu as Dila
 Don as Don
 Ilias Kobra
 Nasrin as Item number (Special appearance in "Mon Chaile" song)

Soundtrack

The film soundtrack is composed by Emon Saha and lyrics written by Kabir Bakul. Also a song composed by Ali Akram Shuvo and wrote by Moniruzzaman Monir.

Release
The film released in 67 theatres on October 16, 2013 all around the country.

References

External links
 
 [https://m.youtube.com/watch?v=U7JqGBw8bWQ Premik Number One] on YouTube

2013 films
Bengali-language Bangladeshi films
2010s Bengali-language films
Films scored by Emon Saha
Films scored by Ali Akram Shuvo